The 36th TCA Awards were announced on September 14, 2020, via an online event due to the COVID-19 pandemic. The nominees were announced by the Television Critics Association on July 9, 2020.

Winners and nominees

Shows with multiple nominations

The following shows received multiple nominations:

Shows with multiple wins

The following shows received multiple wins:

Notes

References

External links
 Official website

2020 television awards
2020 in American television
TCA Awards ceremonies